Cheetah Mobile Inc is a Chinese mobile Internet company headquartered in Beijing. , it has more than 634 million monthly active users.

History

Formation 
Chen Rui (:zh:陳睿 current CEO of Bilibili) founded Cheetah Mobile. The company was established in 2010 as a merger of Kingsoft Security (Chen served as General Manager) and Conew Image, and grew to be the second-largest internet security software provider in China, according to iResearch.  The company is located at 1st Yaojiayuan South Rd, Chaoyang District, Beijing, China.

Initial public offering
In 2014, Cheetah Mobile launched an IPO selling 13 million American depositary shares at US$14 per share, and thereby raised US$168 million. The IPO was managed by Morgan Stanley, JP Morgan Chase & Co., and Credit Suisse Group. Kingsoft and Tencent are major investors in Cheetah Mobile, holding 54% and 18% respectively.

Post IPO 
In the late 2015, Cheetah Mobile announced that it had entered into a global strategic partnership with Yahoo. The company incorporated Yahoo's search and native advertising platforms within its own apps. As a result of this, Cheetah Mobile stated that its revenue generated from Yahoo increased by 30 percent daily within the first two weeks.

In February 2016, Cheetah Mobile and Cubot launched the CheetahPhone, an Android 6.0 Marshmallow based smartphone, at MWC in Barcelona, Spain.

Acquisition 
On August 2, 2016, Cheetah Mobile announced its acquisition of a French startup News Republic for $57 million. News Republic is a news aggregator.

Ad fraud accusation 
In March 2020, Cheetah Mobile was banned from Google Play due to their scheme of ad fraud, resulting in all of their games being removed as part of a 600 app deletion.

Insider trading charges 
In September 2022, the U.S. Securities and Exchange Commission charged the company's CEO and former President with insider trading.

Products 
Cheetah Mobile's ad supported products include:

Computer applications
Clean Master for PC – It claims to improve performance by erasing junk files and optimizing device memory. A premium version is available that recovers lost files and updates drivers, among other claims. It is available for PC and Android.
CM Browser – a web browser based on Chromium, it claims to be the first dual-core security browser in China.

Games
 Big Bang 2048 – Similar to the game 2048, but with numbers replaced by animals.
 Just Get 10 – A puzzle where players tap adjacent tiles with the same number, which will then pop up. Tapping again merges the position to where it was tapped.
 Don't Tap The White Tile – Players must avoid white tiles.
 Piano Tiles 2: Don't Tap The White Tile 2 – The sequel of Don't Tap The White Tile, including new gameplay and songs.
 Rolling Sky -  A fast-paced game where players must roll a ball through different levels accompanied with many different types of music, primarily EDM. Formerly owned by TurboChilli, Rolling Sky became the most commercially successful game developed by Cheetah Mobile, garnering 400 million downloads worldwide.
 Tap Tap Dash - A fast-paced game where players must tap to keep their character from falling off the platform throughout different levels.
 Rolling Sky 2 - A fast-paced game where players run around obstacles and collect moons
 Dancing Line - A rhythm game to tap in the beat. A collaboration with another company Boombit, it shares many similarities with Rolling Sky.
 Arrow.io - an archery game that ranges in 4 arenas.
 Tap Tap Fish: AbyssRium - a marine aquarium game which the goal is to collect all the hidden fishes.

Mobile applications
 AnTuTu
 Armorfly - A browser which claims to have high privacy and security.
 Battery Doctor – Claims to extend smartphone battery standby time.
 Clean Master – Claims to improve smartphone performance and free storage space by erasing junk files, optimizing memory, and providing full protection from viruses, trojans, and other malware. There is significant controversy online to whether the application is actually effective or not.
 Cloud Space of CM Security - A cloud backup tool to back up user's photos, call logs, contact information and SMS messages.
 CM Backup – A cloud backup service.
 CM Browser – A mobile web browser with antivirus security functions.
 CM Flashlight – An ad supported flashlight app with a built-in compass.
 CM Keyboard - A keyboard application that allows customizing the phone's keyboard.
 CM Launcher 3D – Launcher only compatible with Android devices.
 CM Locker  - An Android lockscreen app. 
 Security Master – An antivirus application for Android phones.
 CM Security VPN - A free VPN application. 
 CM Speed Booster - An Android optimizer.
 CM Swipe - A quick access tool for easy access to apps and tools with just one hand.
 CM TouchMe - An assistive tool to quickly access system operations or apps, inspired by the assistive touch tool in iOS.
 CM Transfer - A file transfer tool to exchange photos, videos, music & apps offline.
 CM QR Code & Bar Code Scanner - An ad supported QR code scanner tool hidden in QR & Bar Codes.
 File Manager – Popular for Android, bought in early 2014 from Rhythm Software, which is based in Haidian, Beijing, PRC .
 GoTap! - A data management tool that claims to help users manage or reduce mobile data usage and battery.
 Heartbleed Scanner - A heartbleed virus scanner application that scans the Android operating system to see if the device is vulnerable to the 2014 Heartbleed exploit.
 Notification Cleaner - A notification manager tool.
QuickPic Gallery – A photo gallery application. Which was acquired from Q-Supreme team in 2015.
Ransomware Killer - A ransomware virus killer application that claims to kill malware  on an infected Android phone.
Simplelocker Cleaner - A locker cleaner application that performs a full scan of an Android device, and checks for example if a Cryptolocker virus is present. Claims to use a special anti-hijack solution to remove an infection. 
Speed Test - A WiFi speed test tool that helps scan WiFi connections, check the security and the speed of the connection, and then optimize the speed.
Struts 2 Web Server Scanner - A web server scanner application that scans browser history and detects whether recently visited websites are affected by the Struts 2 flaw.
Stubborn Trojan Killer - A mobile antivirus application that claims to get rid of stubborn trojans that can't be deleted by other common antivirus apps.
WhatsCall - A caller application with free global and secure calls.
2Face - An account management application for instant simultaneous access to two exact copies of applications such as social, gaming and messaging apps on a single device.

AI
 Artificial Intelligence - AI technology platform to power Cheetah Mobile full line of products.
 OrionOS – a platform for smart devices in collaboration with OrionStar
 Cheetah Voicepod – a voice recognition speaker based on AI
 Cheetah GreetBot - a receptionist robot to deal with customers
 Cheetah FriendBot - an educational robot for children
 Cheetah VendBot - a vending machine robot

Commercial
 Cheetah Ads - Cheetah Mobile's self-operated ad platform offering a wide range of ad formats, from high-performing display and native ads, to full-screen vertical video.

Big Data
 Cheetah Data - a global mobile big data analysis platform.

Controversies
Despite the popularity of its Clean Master Android App, it was reported in 2014 that ads promoting Clean Master manipulate Android users with deceptive tactics when browsing websites within the app's advertising framework. In April 2014, Ferenc László Nagy from Sophos Labs captured some pop-up ads that led to Clean Master, warning the device had been infected with a virus.

In July 2014, Cheetah Mobile encouraged users to uninstall Google Chrome and replace it with Cheetah Mobile's own browser during Clean Master's clean up and optimization process. This practice allowed Cheetah Mobile to gain unfair position in the marketplace and led to a Google crackdown.

In December 2018, Cheetah Mobile was implicated in a massive click fraud scheme, leading Google to remove two of its apps from its Play Store. Cheetah Mobile has denied the charges. In February 2020, Google banned nearly 600 apps on the Play Store including all Cheetah Mobile's apps "for violating our disruptive ads policy and disallowed interstitial policy."

As of 10 March 2020, all apps made by Cheetah Mobile, along with the benchmarking AnTuTu apps, have been banned from the Google Play Store.

Cheetah Mobile's web browser mobile app, CM Browser, was banned in India on 29 June 2020 in the aftermath of the 2020–2021 China–India skirmishes.

References

External links
 

Online companies of China
Software companies based in Beijing
Computer security software companies
Video game development companies
Chinese companies established in 2009
Software companies established in 2009
Companies based in Beijing
Chinese brands
Companies listed on the New York Stock Exchange
Mobile software
Internet censorship in India